The Great Offensive was the largest and final military operation of the Turkish War of Independence, fought between the Turkish Armed Forces loyal to the government of the Grand National Assembly of Turkey, and the Kingdom of Greece, ending the Greco-Turkish War. The offensive began on 26 August 1922 with the Battle of Dumlupınar. The Turks amassed around 98,000 men, the largest number since the beginning of the war, to begin the offensive against the Greek army of approximately 130,000 men. The Turkish army lacked motorized vehicles; its forces consisted of infantry and cavalry units, and logistical support was provided by a supply system based on ox carts.

The Turkish troops reached the sea on 9 September with the capture of İzmir. The operation ended on 18 September 1922 with the capture of Erdek and Biga. The staggering defeat caused great dissent within the Greek army and a general loss of morale, which led to unwillingness to continue fighting. On top of this, numerous Greek divisions had been encircled and destroyed as effective fighting units, which meant that the Greek army had lost its offensive capabilities and was unable to organize a controlled retreat, leading to numerous Greek POWs.

Advance
The offensive started with the Battle of Dumlupınar, where the Turkish army defeated the Greek army within four days, paving the way for a rapid offensive. After Mustafa Kemal Atatürk's order issued in the Forces of the Grand National Assembly of Turkey, the main part of the Turkish Army began moving toward İzmir and a secondary force began moving from Eskişehir toward Bursa. The commander-in-chief of the Greek forces in Asia Minor, Nikolaos Trikoupis, surrendered on 29 August. On 7 September, Aydın, Germencik and Kuşadası fell under Turkish control. On 16 September, the last Greek troops left Çeşme, and two days later the Greek III Corps left Erdek. The British Chief of Staff expressed his admiration for the Turkish military operation.

Gallery

See also
List of high-ranking commanders of the Turkish War of Independence
Occupation of Smyrna
Great Fire of Smyrna
Great Thessaloniki Fire

References

Footnotes

Bibliography 
 Kemal Niş, Reşat Söker, Türk İstiklâl Harbi, Batı Cephesi, Büyük Taarruz’da Takip Harekâtı (31 Ağustos – 18 Eylül 1922), Cilt 2, Kısım. 6, 3. Kitap, Genkurmay Başkanlığı Basımevi, Ankara, 1969. 
 İsmet Görgülü, Büyük Taarruz: 70 nci Yıl Armağanı, Genelkurmay Başkanlığı Basımevi, Ankara, 1992. 
 Celal Erikan, Komutan Atatürk, Cilt I-II, Üçüncü Basım, Türkiye İş Bankası Kültür Yayınları, İstanbul, 2001, .

External links

"9 Eylül 1922 İzmir'in Kurtuluşu" ("9 September 1922 Rebelation of İzmir"), Tarihten Kesitler, General Staff of the Republic of Turkey. 
İzmir Marşı (Izmir March)  (lyrics) in Google Videos. 

Conflicts in 1922
Dumlupinar 1922
1922 in the Ottoman Empire
1922 in Greece
History of Aydın Province
History of İzmir Province
History of Kütahya Province
History of Manisa Province
History of Uşak Province
20th century in İzmir
August 1922 events
September 1922 events